Luis Alberto Maza Mayorca (born June 22, 1980 in Cumaná, Venezuela) is a Venezuelan former professional baseball infielder. He played for the Los Angeles Dodgers of the Major League Baseball (MLB) in 2008. Listed at 5'9", 180 lb., he bats and throws right-handed. Primarily a second baseman, Maza is a versatile player who can play at shortstop, third base, and left field.

Career

Minnesota Twins

Los Angeles Dodgers
A Free agent after 2006, Maza signed with the Los Angeles Dodgers and split time between Double-A Jacksonville and Triple-A Las Vegas. Through , he was a .284 hitter with 525 runs and a .334 on-base percentage in 924 minor league games.

He hit .378 with Las Vegas and made his major league debut as a defensive replacement for the Dodgers in the ninth inning against the Milwaukee Brewers on May 14, . He made his first start at shortstop the following day and went 1 for 3, getting his first career hit off Brewers starter Ben Sheets. In 45 games with the Dodgers in 2008, Maza hit .228.

In 2009, Maza spent the entire year with the AAA Albuquerque Isotopes. He hit .300 with 5 homers and 44 RBI. He was a utility player for Albuquerque. He played second, third, left, two innings in center, and got two outs as a pitcher in a blowout loss to the Round Rock Express on July 20.

Philadelphia Phillies
He signed as a free agent with the Philadelphia Phillies on January 25, 2010. With the Lehigh Valley IronPigs, he hit only .220 in 51 games.

Houston Astros
The Phillies sent Maza to the Houston Astros on June 25, 2010. He played in 15 games for the Round Rock Express, hitting .258. He was released on August 6.

BBC Grosseto
In 2011, Maza signed one-year contract with the Italian team Bbc Grosseto.

Highlights
 Appalachian League All-Star (2000)
 Florida State League All-Star (2002)
 Caribbean Series All-Star (2008)

See also
 List of Major League Baseball players from Venezuela

External links

Luis Maza at B-R Bullpen
Pura Pelota

1980 births
Living people
Albuquerque Isotopes players
Bravos de Margarita players
Cardenales de Lara players
Elizabethton Twins players
Fort Myers Miracle players
Grosseto Baseball Club players
Gulf Coast Twins players
Jacksonville Suns players
Las Vegas 51s players
Lehigh Valley IronPigs players
Los Angeles Dodgers players
Major League Baseball second basemen
Major League Baseball shortstops
Major League Baseball players from Venezuela
New Britain Rock Cats players
People from Cumaná
Quad City River Bandits players
Rimini Baseball Club players
Rochester Red Wings players
Round Rock Express players
Tigres de Aragua players
Venezuelan expatriate baseball players in Italy
Venezuelan expatriate baseball players in the United States
World Baseball Classic players of Venezuela
2009 World Baseball Classic players